Legio II Adiutrix ("Second Legion, the Rescuer"), was a legion of the Imperial Roman army founded in AD 70 by the emperor Vespasian (r. 69–79), originally composed of Roman navy marines of the classis Ravennatis. There are still records of II Adiutrix in the Rhine border in the beginning of the 4th century. The legion's symbols were a Capricorn and Pegasus.

History

The first assignment of II Adiutrix was in Germania Inferior, where the Batavian rebellion was at its peak. After the defeat of the rebels, II Adiutrix followed general Quintus Petillius Cerialis to Britain to deal with another rebellion led by Venutius. During the next years, the legion was to stay in the British Islands to subdue the rebel tribes of Scotland and Wales, with base camp probably at Chester.

In 87, the legion was recalled to the continent to participate in the Dacian wars of emperor Domitian. Between 94 and 95, still in Dacia, later emperor Hadrian served as military tribune in the II Adiutrix.

In the summer of 106 the legion took part to the siege of the Dacian Capital Sarmisegetusa. After Trajan's Dacian Wars of 101–106, the legion was located in Aquincum (modern Budapest), which would be its base camp for the years to come. Despite this, the legion or vexillations or subunits took part in:
 Lucius Verus's campaign against the Parthian Empire (162–166)
 Marcus Aurelius' campaign against the Marcomanni and the Quadi (171–173)
 Marcus Aurelius' campaign against the Quadi (179–180). The Legion was commanded by Marcus Valerius Maximianus in Laugaricio.
 Caracalla's campaign against the Alemanni (213)
 Gordian's campaign against the Sassanid Empire (238)

In 193, II Adiutrix supported emperor Septimius Severus during his struggle for the purple.

Attested members

Epigraphic inscriptions 

- Gaio Valerio Crispo veterano ex legione II Adiutrice Pia Fideli. Chester (Deva), U.K. RIB 478.

- Lucius Terentius Claudia tribu Fuscus Apro miles legionis II Adiutricis Piae Fidelis. Chester, U.K. RIB 477.

- Lucius Valerius Luci filius Claudia tribu Seneca Savaria / miles legionis II Adiutricis Piae Fidelis. Chester, U.K. RIB 480.

- Gaius Calventius Gai filius Claudia tribu Celer Apro miles legionis II Adiutricis Piae Fidelis / Vibi Clementis (...). Chester, U.K. RIB 475.

- Gaius Iuventius Gai filius Claudia tribu Capito Apro / miles legionis II Adiutricis Piae Fidelis / Iuli Clementis annorum XL stipendiorum XVII. Chester, U.K. RIB 476.

-  Quintus Valerius Quinti filius Claudia tribu Fronto Celea / miles legionis II Adiutricis Piae Fidelis annorum L stipendiorum XXṾ (...). Chester, U.K. RIB 479.

- Voltimesis P̣udens Gai filius Sergia tribu Augusta eques legionis II Adiutricis Piae Fidelis annorum XXXII stipendiorum 
XIII hic situs est. Chester, U.K. RIB 482.

- Gaius Murrius Gai filius Arniensis Foro Iuli Modestus miles legionis II Adiutricis Piae Fidelis / Iuli Secundi annorum) XXV stipendiorum / hic situs est. Bath, U.K. (Aquae Sulis). RIB 157 = CIL VII 48.

- Titus Valerius Titi filius Claudia tribu Pudens Savaria miles legionis II Adiutricis Piae Fidelis / Dossenni Proculi annorum XXX aera VI heres de suo posuit hic situs est. Lincoln (Lindum), U.K. RIB 258 = CIL VII 185.

- legionis II Adiutricis Piae Fidelis / Ponti Proculi Lucius Licinius Luci filius Galeria tribu Saliga Lugdunonnorum XX
stipendiorum II. Lincoln (Lindum), U.K. RIB 253 = CIL VII 186.

- Quintus Cumelius / Quinti filius / Fabia Celer Bracarensis / veteranus legionis II Adiutricis hic situs annorum LXXV (...). Astorga (Asturica), Spain. CIL II 2639.

- Fortunae Balneari sacrum / Valerius  Bucco miles legionis II Adiutricis Piae Fidelis / decuria Aemili (...). Segovia, Spain. CIL II 2763.

- VICTORIAE AVGVSTORV(m) EXERCITUS QVI LAV GARICIONE SEDIT MIL(ites) L(egionis) II DCCCLV (Marcus Valerius) MAXIMIANUS LEG(atus) LEG (ionis) II AD(iutricis) CVR(avit) F(aciendum). Laugaricio (today Trenčín), Slovakia.

See also

List of Roman legions
Roman legion

Notes

External links
 roman-britain.co.uk
 livius.org account of Legio II Adiutrix
 Familia Gladiatoria - Hungary, Hungarian reenactment group

02 Adiutrix
Marine forces history
Military units and formations established in the 1st century
70s establishments in the Roman Empire
70s establishments
Roman marines
70 establishments